The 2016 Durand Cup was the 128th edition of the Durand Cup since the tournament's founding in 1888. 12 teams competed in the tournament hosted at the Ambedkar Stadium and Harbaksh Stadium in Delhi from 28 August 2016. The final took place at the Ambedkar Stadium on 11 September 2016.

Army Green won the tournament for the first time by defeating NEROCA on penalties 6–5.

Rounds and dates

Prize money

Teams

Group stage
All times listed below are at IST

Group A

Group B

Bracket

Semi-finals

Final

References

External links
 Durand Cup website .

Durand Cup seasons
2016 domestic association football cups
2016–17 in Indian football